Fusinus colus, common name the Distaff spindle or Long-tailed Spindle, is a species of sea snail, a marine gastropod mollusk in the family Fasciolariidae, the spindle snails, the tulip snails and their allies.

Distribution 
This species is present in the Indian Ocean and in the western and central Pacific Ocean, from East Africa to Melanesia, southern Japan, and southern Queensland.

Habitat
These sea snails are common in coastal waters at depths of 5 to 40 m. They inhabit littoral and the tidal zone and prefer sandy bottoms. They feed on benthic invertebrates.

Description
The size of an adult shell can reach . These shells are thick, long, biconic, spindle-shaped, with many spiral ribs, grooves and nodules. The spire is elongated. The siphonal canal is very long. The outer surface is usually whitish, but may be yellowish, brown or reddish in color.

References

Bibliography
 A. G Hinton – Guide to shells of Papua New Guinea: 68 colour plates illustrating over 1,450 individual shells representing 950 distinct species Paperback  
 Arianna Fulvo and Roberto Nistri (2005). 350 coquillages du monde entier. Delachaux et Niestlé (Paris) : 256 p.
 Callomon P. & Snyder M.A. (2007). On the genus Fusinus in Japan III: Nine further species, with type selections. Venus 66(1–2): 19–47.
 Cornelis Swennen and Robert Moolenbeek – The Molluscs of the southern Gulf of Thailand
 Drivas, J. & M. Jay (1988) Coquillages de La Réunion et de l'île Maurice
 Linnaeus C. 1758. Systema Naturae per regna tria naturae, secundum classes, ordines, genera, species, cum characteribus, differentiis, synonymis, locis. Editio decima, reformata Vermes. Testacea. str. 753. Holmiae. (Salvius).
 Marais J.P. & R.N. Kilburn (2010) Fasciolariidae. pp. 106–137, in: Marais A.P. & Seccombe A.D. (eds), Identification guide to the seashells of South Africa. Volume 1. Groenkloof: Centre for Molluscan Studies. 376 pp.

colus
Gastropods described in 1758
Taxa named by Carl Linnaeus